Ahmed Javad Pasha, also known as Kabaaghachlyzadeh Ahmed Javad Pasha and Javad Shakir Pasha (1851 – 10 August 1900), was an Ottoman career officer and statesman. He served as Grand Vizier of the Ottoman Empire from September 4, 1891, to June 8, 1895.

He was the uncle of Turkish writer Cevat Şakir Kabaağaçlı and the painters Aliye Berger and Fahrelnissa Zeid.

References

1851 births
1900 deaths
19th-century Grand Viziers of the Ottoman Empire
Ottoman governors of Crete